John Rawlins (born Caerphilly, 7 June 1957) is a former Welsh rugby union player who played as a prop. He played 16 games for Cardiff in the season 1981/82 before leaving to join Newport where he played 188 games. One of which was a Cup game against Cardiff.

Rawlins was a member of Cardiff Youth and then played a couple of games for Cardiff and also went on the tour to South Africa in the summer of 1982. John just missed out on a first XV cap. In 1982, Rawlins moved to Newport, forming a formidable front row with Rhys Morgan and Mike Watkins. He also was in the 1987 Rugby World Cup squad and named in the squad for a Test with Japan but never saw action, as he was replaced by Jeff Whitefoot. In 1987, Rawlins moved to Swansea, where he had 2 caps and ended his career.

Notes

External links
Profile at Cardiff RFC website
Profile at Newport RFC website
Profile at Swansea RFC website

1957 births
Living people
Cardiff RFC players
Newport RFC players
Rugby union players from Caerphilly
Rugby union props
Swansea RFC players
Wales international rugby union players
Wales rugby union captains
Welsh rugby union players